Mac Tier/Francis Island Water Aerodrome, formerly , was located  west of MacTier, Ontario, Canada.

References

Defunct seaplane bases in Ontario